"" ("Risen from Ruins") is a German patriotic song that was the national anthem of East Germany during its existence from 1949 to 1990.

History

Background
In 1949, the Soviet occupation zone of Allied-occupied Germany became a socialist state under the name of the "German Democratic Republic" (GDR). For the nascent state's national anthem, the poet Johannes Becher, who later became the East German Minister of Culture, wrote the lyrics. Two musicians, Ottmar Gerster and Hanns Eisler, proposed music to Becher's lyrics, and Eisler's version was selected.

History
Written in 1949, the East German national anthem reflects the early stages of German separation, in which continuing progress towards reunification of the occupation zones was seen by most Germans as appropriate and natural. Consequently, Becher's lyrics develop several connotations of "unity" and combine them with "fatherland", meaning Germany as a whole. However, this concept soon would not conform to an increasingly icy Cold War context, especially after the Berlin Wall had been erected in 1961 by the East German government.

In September 1973, East and West Germany were admitted to the United Nations simultaneously, following talks between the two governments that conferred a degree of mutual recognition. The term Germany was later removed from the East German constitution, and only the national anthem's tune was played on official occasions. No new lyrics were ever written to replace Becher's, which continued to be used unofficially, especially after  in late 1989: once it became clear that the countries were actually moving towards reunification, East German television Deutscher Fernsehfunk reinstated the work and signed off every night with a joyous symphonic rendition of the vocal arrangement, with accompanying picturesque footage of East Germany's main tourist attractions.

"" ceased to be a national anthem when the German Democratic Republic dissolved and its states joined the Federal Republic of Germany as a result of German reunification in 1990. "Deutschlandlied", composed in 1841, became the national anthem of a united Germany again. East German Premier Lothar de Maizière had proposed that Becher's lyrics be added to the united German national anthem, but this was rejected by his West German counterpart, chancellor Helmut Kohl.

At the end of its last broadcast on 2 October 1990, the East German international radio broadcaster Radio Berlin International signed off with a vocal version of the East German national anthem.

In November 1995, "" was played again when German President Roman Herzog visited Brazil. This was the first event at which the anthem had been played since the German reunification.

Lyrics

See also

 "Children's Hymn"
 "Deutschlandlied"
 "Hymne an Deutschland"
 "Lied von der blauen Fahne"

Notes

References

External links

"Auferstanden aus Ruinen", MP3 at sovmusic.ru
Text and melody (MIDI) and sheetmusic at ingeb.org

1949 songs
Historical national anthems
National symbols of East Germany
Compositions by Hanns Eisler
East German music
German anthems
German patriotic songs